Balbir Singh Chauhan (born 2 July 1949) is the chairperson of Cauvery water dispute tribunal and the chairman of the 21st Law Commission of India. He was a judge of the Supreme Court of India from May 2009 to July 2014. He previously served as the Chief Justice of Orissa High Court from July 2008 to May 2009.

In July 2020, he was appointed to lead a judicial commission that would look into the Vikas Dubey case.

References 

Living people
1949 births
Judges of the Allahabad High Court
Justices of the Supreme Court of India
Chief Justices of the Orissa High Court
20th-century Indian judges
21st-century Indian judges